Discography for jazz saxophonist Anthony Braxton.

Discography

As leader/co-leader
 1968: 3 Compositions of New Jazz (Delmark)
 1969: For Alto (Delmark)
 1969: Silence (Freedom)
 1969: Anthony Braxton (BYG Actuel)
 1970: This Time... (BYG Actuel)
 1971: Recital Paris 71 (Futura)
 1971: Together Alone (Delmark, [1974]) with Joseph Jarman
 1972: Saxophone Improvisations Series F (America)
 1972: Town Hall 1972 (Trio)
 1972: Donna Lee (America)
 1974: In the Tradition (SteepleChase)
 1974: In the Tradition Volume 2 (SteepleChase)
 1974: Quartet: Live at Moers Festival (Ring)
 1974: First Duo Concert (Emanem) with Derek Bailey
 1974: Trio and Duet (Sackville) with Dave Holland, Leo Smith and Richard Teitelbaum
 1974: New York, Fall 1974 (Arista)
 1975: The Montreux/Berlin Concerts (Arista)
 1975: Five Pieces 1975 (Arista)
 1976: Creative Orchestra Music 1976 (Arista)
 1976: Elements of Surprise (Moers) with George E. Lewis
 1976: Donaueschingen (Duo) 1976 (hatART)
 1976: Dortmund (Quartet) 1976 (HatART)
 1976: Duets 1976 (Arista) with Muhal Richard Abrams
 1976: Solo: Live at Moers Festival (Ring)
 1977: Four Compositions (1973) (Denon)
 1978: The Complete Braxton (Freedom)
 1978: Creative Orchestra (Köln) 1978
 1978: For Four Orchestras (Arista)
 1978: Birth and Rebirth (Black Saint) with Max Roach
 1978: For Trio (Arista)
 1979: Performance (Quartet) 1979 (hatART)
 1979: Anthony Braxton / Robert Schumann String Quartet (Sound Aspects)
 1979: Seven Compositions 1978 (Moers)
 1979: Alto Saxophone Improvisations 1979 (Arista)
 1980: For Two Pianos (Arista)
 1981: Composition No. 96 (Leo)
 1982: Open Aspects '82 (hatART) with Richard Teitelbaum
 1982: Six Duets (1982) (Cecma) with John Lindberg
 1983: Composition 113 (Sound Aspects)
 1983: Four Compositions (Quartet) 1983 (Black Saint)
 1984: Prag 1984 (Quartet Performance) (Sound Aspects)
 1985: Seven Standards (1985) Vols. 1 & 2 (Magenta)
 1985: Six Compositions (Quartet) 1984 (Black Saint)
 1985: Quartet (London) 1985 (Leo)
 1986: Moment Précieux (Les Disques Victo)
 1986: Five Compositions (Quartet) 1986 (Black Saint)
 1988: 19 (Solo) Compositions, 1988 (New Albion)
 1988: Ensemble (Victoriaville) 1988 (Victo)
 1988: 2 Compositions (Järvenpää) 1988 (Leo) with Ensemble Braxtonia
 1988: Solo (London) 1988 (Impetus)
 1988: A Memory of Vienna with Ran Blake
 1987: Six Monk's Compositions (1987) (Black Saint)
 1988: Kol Nidre (Sound Aspects) with Andrew Voigt
 1988: Zurich Concerts (Intakt) with the London Jazz Composers Orchestra
 1988: The Aggregate (Sound Aspects) with Rova Saxophone Quartet
 1989: Eugene (1989) (Black Saint)
 1989: Seven Compositions (Trio) 1989 (hatART)
 1989: Duets Vancouver 1989 (Music & Arts) with Marilyn Crispell
 1990: Four Compositions (Solo, Duo & Trio) 1982/1988 (hatART)
 1990: Eight (+3) Tristano Compositions, 1989: For Warne Marsh (hatART)
 1991: Duets: Hamburg 1991 (Music & Arts) with Peter Niklas Wilson
 1991: Duo (Amsterdam) 1991 (Okka Disk) with Georg Gräwe
 1991: 2 Compositions (Ensemble) 1989/1991 (hatART)
 1991: Six Compositions: Quartet (Antilles)
 1991: Willisau (Quartet) 1991 (hatART)
 1991: Composition 98 (hatART)
 1992: Wesleyan (12 Altosolos) 1992 (hatART)
 1992: (Victoriaville) 1992 (Victo)
 1992: Composition No. 165 (for 18 instruments) (New Albion)
 1993: Duets (1993) (Music & Arts) with Mario Pavone
 1993: 9 Standards (Quartet) 1993 (Leo)
 1993: Trio (London) 1993 (Leo) with Evan Parker and Paul Rutherford
 1993: Quartet (Santa Cruz) 1993 (hatART)
 1993: Duo (Leipzig) 1993 (Music & Arts) with Ted Reichman
 1993: Duo (London) 1993 (Leo) with Evan Parker
 1994: Composition No. 174 (Leo)
 1994: Small Ensemble Music (Wesleyan) 1994 (Splasc(h))
 1994: Duo (Wesleyan) 1994 (Leo) with Abraham Adzenyah
 1994: Knitting Factory (Piano/Quartet) 1994, Vol. 1 (Leo)
 1994: Knitting Factory (Piano/Quartet) 1994, Vol. 2 (Leo)
 1995: Twelve Compositions (Music & Arts)
 1995: 11 Compositions (Duo) 1995 (Leo) with Brett Larner
 1995: 10 Compositions (Duet) 1995 (Konnex) with Joe Fonda
 1995: Octet (New York) 1995 (Braxton House)
 1995: Solo Piano (Standards) 1995 (No More)
 1995: Seven Standards 1995 (Knitting Factory) with Mario Pavone
 1995: Ensemble (New York) 1995 (Braxton House)
 1995: Four Compositions (Quartet) 1995 (Braxton House)
 1995: Anthony Braxton's Charlie Parker Project 1993 (hatART)
 1996: Piano Quartet, Yoshi's 1994 (Music & Arts)
 1996: Composition 192 (Leo) with Lauren Newton
 1996: Tentet (New York) 1996 (Braxton House)
 1996: Duet: Live at Merkin Hall (Music & Arts) with Richard Teitelbaum
 1996: Sextet (Istanbul) 1996 (Braxton House)
 1996: 14 Compositions (Traditional) 1996 (Leo) with Stewart Gillmor
 1996: Composition No. 102 for Orchestra & Puppet Theatre (Braxton House)
 1996: Composition No. 173 (Black Saint)
 1998: Compositions 10 & 16 (+101) (hatART)
 1998: 4 Compositions (Washington D.C.) 1998 (Braxton House)
 1998: Trillium R (Braxton House)
 2000: Quintet (Basel) 1977 (hatOLOGY)
 2000: Composition No. 94 for Three Instrumentalists (1980) (Golden Years of New Jazz)
 2000: 9 Compositions (Hill) 2000 (CIMP)
 2000: Ten Compositions (Quartet) 2000 (CIMP)
 2000: Compositions/Improvisations 2000 (CIMP) with Scott Rosenberg
 2000: Composition No. 247 (Leo)
 2001: Composition No. 169 + (186 + 206 + 214) (Leo)
 2001: 8 Compositions (Quintet) 2001 (CIMP)
 2001: Four Compositions (GTM) 2000 (Delmark)
 2002: Duets [Wesleyan] 2002
 2002: 8 Standards (Wesleyan 2001)
 2002: Quartet (Birmingham) 1985 (Leo)
 2002: Quartet (Coventry) 1985 (Leo)
 2002: Ninetet (Yoshi's) 1997 Vol. 1 (Leo)
 2003: Two Compositions (Trio) 1998 (Leo)
 2002: Solo (Köln) 1978
 2003: Solo (Milano) 1979, Vol. 1
 2003: Solo (NYC) 2002
 2003: 23 Standards (Quartet) 2003 (Leo)
 2003: Ninetet (Yoshi's) 1997 Vol. 2 (Leo)
 2004: Triotone with György Szabados and Vladimir Tarasov (Leo)
 2004: Duo Palindrome 2002 Vols. 1 and 2 (Intakt) with Andrew Cyrille
 2005: Shadow Company
 2005: 20 Standards (Quartet) 2003 (Leo)
 2005: Six Standards (Quintet) 1996 (Splasc(H))
 2005: Ninetet (Yoshi's) 1997 Vol. 3 (Leo)
 2006: Live at the Royal Festival Hall (Leo)
 2006: Compositions 175 & 126 (Leo)
 2006: 4 Compositions (Ulrichsberg) 2005 (Leo)
 2006: Duo (Victoriaville) 2005 (with Fred Frith)
 2007: Trio (Victoriaville) 2007 (Victo)
 2007: Ninetet (Yoshi's) 1997 Vol. 4 (Leo)
 2007: Solo (Pisa) 1982 (Golden Years of New Jazz)
 2007:   Anthony Braxton & the AIMToronto Orchestra Creative Orchestra (Guelph) 2007 (Spool (record label))
 2008: Quartet 2006: Ghost Trance Music (Important)
 2008: Beyond Quantum (Tzadik)
 2010: 19 Standards (Quartet) 2003 (Leo)
 2010: Duets (Pittsburgh) 2008 (with Ben Opie) (OMP)
 2010: Old Dogs (2007) (with Gerry Hemingway) (Mode)
 2008: Quartet (Mestre) 2008 (Caligola)
 2009: Improvisations (Duo) 2008 (with Maral Yakshieva) (SoLyd)
 2009: Quartet (Moscow) 2008 (Leo)
 2013: ABCD (NotTwo)
 2013: Echo Echo Mirror House (Victo)
 2013: Ensemble Montaigne (BAU 4) 2013 (Leo)
 2013: Quartet Warsaw 2012
 2014: 12 Duets (New Braxton House)
 2014: Trio (New Haven) 2013
 2016: 3 Compositions (EEMHM) 2011 (Firehouse 12)
 2016: Anthony Braxton: Trillium J (The Non-Unconfessionables) (New Braxton House)
 2016: Quintet (Tristano) 2014 (New Braxton House)
 2016: Duo (DCWM) 2013 (RogueArt)
 2017: Solo (Victoriaville) 2017 (Victo)
 2018: Sextet (Parker) 1993 (New Braxton House)
 2019: Quartet (New Haven) 2014 (Firehouse 12)
 2020: Duo (Improv) 2017 (New Braxton House)
 2020: Duo (Bologna) 2018 (I Dischi Di Angelica)
 2021: Quartet (Standards) 2020 (New Braxton House)

With Circle
 Paris Concert (ECM, 1972) – recorded in 1971
 Circling In (Blue Note, 1975) – recorded in 1970
 Circulus (Blue Note, 1978) – recorded in 1970

With Creative Construction Company
 Creative Construction Company (Muse, 1975) – recorded in 1970
 Creative Construction Company Vol. II (Muse, 1976) – recorded in 1970

As sideman
 1968: Levels and Degrees of Light Muhal Richard Abrams (Delmark)
 1969: The 8th of July 1969, Gunter Hampel (Birth)
 1969: Black Suite, Jacques Coursil (BYG Actuel)
 1969: Luna Surface, Alan Silva and his Celestrial Communications Orchestra (BYG Actuel)
 1970: Afternoon of a Georgia Faun, Marion Brown (ECM)
 1973: Conference of the Birds, Dave Holland (ECM)
 1974: Royal Volume 1, Derek Bailey (Incus)
 1975: For Players Only, Leroy Jenkins (JCOA Records)
 1976: All The Things We Are, Dave Brubeck (Atlantic)
 1977: The Iron Men, Woody Shaw (Muse)
 1979: One in Two - Two in One, Max Roach (Hathut)
 1979: Sketches from Bamboo, Roscoe Mitchell (Moers)
 1985: Szabraxtondos, György Szabados (Hungaroton-Krém)
 1992: Two Lines, David Rosenboom
 1996: Eight by Three, Borah Bergman
 2003: Organic Resonance, Wadada Leo Smith (Pi)
 2003: Saturn, Conjunct the Grand Canyon in a Sweet Embrace, Wadada Leo Smith (Pi)
 2006: Black Vomit, Wolf Eyes

References

see for full discography the German book: Timo Hoyer: Anthony Braxton – Creative Music. Wolke Verlag, Hofheim 2021.

External links
Discogs entry

Discographies of American artists
Jazz discographies